TTS Moruga CG 27 is a patrol vessel operated by Trinidad and Tobago. It is a Damen Stan 5009 patrol vessel, an innovative design with a Damen Group axe bow.

In January 2018 the vessel was used in the burial at sea of George Maxwell Richards, formerly President of Trinidad and Tobago.

The Morugas first captain was Lieutenant Commander Aldon Jasper.

References

Ships of Trinidad and Tobago Coast Guard
Patrol vessels